Czesław Baran (25 August 1937 – 2 March 2021) was a Polish politician and agronomist.

Biography
Czesław was born in Pietrusy on 25 August 1937 to Bolesław and Regina Baran. He worked as a technician for the state water supply company in Międzyrzec Podlaski from 1955 to 1960 and subsequently handled water supply in Łosice. In 1979, he graduated from the Warsaw University of Life Sciences.

From 1962 to 1975, Baran was leader of the United People's Party in the city of Łosice. He led the Poviat Party Committee from 1981 until its dissolution in 1989. He was also a member of the Provincial Council of the Patriotic Movement for National Rebirth. From 1985 to 1989, he was a member of the Sejm, where he was part of the Local Government Affairs Committee.

Czesław Baran died in Siedlce on 2 March 2021 at the age of 83.

Decorations
Order of Polonia Restituta
Medal of the 30th Anniversary of People's Poland
Medal of the 40th Anniversary of People's Poland

References

1937 births
2021 deaths
Members of the Sejm of the Republic of Poland
People from Łosice County
United People's Party (Poland) politicians
Warsaw University of Life Sciences alumni
Recipients of the Order of Polonia Restituta